Manastir (Bitola) is a city in the southwestern part of the North Macedonia.

Manastir may also refer to:

Places
 Manastir, Haskovo Province, Bulgaria
 Manastir, Plovdiv Province, Bulgaria
 Manastir (Prilep), a village near Prilep, North Macedonia
 , village near Niš, Serbia
 Beli Manastir, a town and municipality in eastern Croatia

Other
 Manastır Mosque, Istanbul, a former Eastern Orthodox church converted into a mosque by the Ottomans
 Manastir Peak, a peak on the Antarctic Peninsula that was named after Manastir, Haskovo Province
 Manastir Vilayet, a first-level administrative division (vilayet) of the Ottoman Empire

See also
Monastir (disambiguation)